Robert Clifford may refer to:
Robert Clifford, 1st Baron Clifford (1274–1314), English soldier and the first Lord Warden of the Marches
Robert Clifford, 3rd Baron Clifford (1305–1344), second son of Robert de Clifford, 1st Baron de Clifford
Robert Clifford, 4th Baron Clifford
Robert Clifford (MP) (died 1423), MP for Kent in 1401
Robert Clifford (cricketer) (1752–1811), English cricketer
Robert Clifford (footballer) (1883–?), Scottish footballer
Robert A. Clifford, American trial attorney
Robert L. Clifford (1924–2014), Associate Justice of the New Jersey Supreme Court
Robert T. Clifford (1835–1878), American soldier and Medal of Honor recipient
Robert W. Clifford (born 1937), American lawyer and Associate Justice of the Maine Supreme Judicial Court
Bob Clifford, Australian shipbuilder, entrepreneur, and businessman
Bob Clifford (footballer) (born 1937), Australian rules footballer
Bob Clifford (American football) (1913–2006), American football player and coach

See also
Clifford Roberts (1894–1977), American investment dealer and golf administrator